Chos Malal Airport is a public use airport located  south-southeast of Chos Malal, Neuquén, Argentina.

See also
List of airports in Argentina

References

External links 
 Airport record for Chos Malal Airport at Landings.com
 

Airports in Neuquén Province
Neuquén Province